The 1980 Avon Championships of Dallas was a women's tennis tournament played on indoor carpet courts at the Moody Coliseum in Dallas, Texas that was part of the 1980 Virginia Slims World Championship Series. It was the ninth edition of the tournament, held from March 3 through March 9, 1980. First-seeded Martina Navratilova won the singles title and earned $30,000 first-prize money.

Finals

Singles
 Martina Navratilova defeated  Evonne Goolagong Cawley 6–3, 6–2
 It was Navratilova's sixth singles title of the year and the 40th of her career.

Doubles
 Billie Jean King /  Martina Navratilova defeated  Rosie Casals /  Wendy Turnbull 4–6, 6–3, 6–3

Prize money

References

External links
 Women's Tennis Association (WTA) tournament edition details
 International Tennis Federation (ITF) tournament edition details

Avon Championships of Dallas
Virginia Slims of Dallas
Avon Championships of Dallas
Dallas
Dallas
Avon Championships of Dallas